Prays friesei is a moth in the family Plutellidae. It is found on the Canary Islands and Madeira.

The larvae possibly feed on Jasminum odoratissimum and/or Picconia excelsa. They mine the leaves of their host plant.

External links
 Prays friesei at www.catalogueoflife.org.
 Fauna Europaea
 bladmineerders.nl

Plutellidae
Moths described in 1992